It was the first edition of this women's tennis event.

Zarina Diyas won the title, defeating Aleksandra Krunić in the final, 6–4, 6–4.

Seeds

Draw

Finals

Top half

Bottom half

References
Main Draw

Aegon Manchester Trophy - Singles
Aegon Manchester Trophy